Batthyány tér (Batthyány Square) is a station on the M2 (East-West) line of the Budapest Metro. It is located under Batthyány Square in Buda, immediately on the right bank of the Danube river. Next to the station, there is the southern terminus of the Szentendre HÉV suburban railway. The station was open on 22 December 1972 as part of the extension of the line from Deák Ferenc tér to Déli pályaudvar.

On the surface, there is a mall next to the Metro entrance, as well the square itself. The station has two tram connections, to 19 and 41.

Passengers can get a good view of the Hungarian Parliament Building and the Chain Bridge from the riverbank.

Connections
Tram: 19, 41
Bus: 11, 39, 109, 111

References

M2 (Budapest Metro) stations
Railway stations opened in 1973